Richard Axel (born July 2, 1946) is an American molecular biologist and university professor in the Department of Neuroscience at Columbia University and investigator at the Howard Hughes Medical Institute. His work on the olfactory system won him and Linda Buck, a former postdoctoral research scientist in his group, the Nobel Prize in Physiology or Medicine in 2004.

Education and early life
Born in New York City to Polish Jewish immigrants, Axel grew up in Brooklyn. He graduated from Stuyvesant High School in 1963, (along with Bruce Bueno de Mesquita and Alexander Rosenberg), received his B.A. in 1967 from Columbia University, and his M.D. in 1971 from Johns Hopkins University. However, he was poorly suited to medicine and graduated on the promise to his department chairman that he would not practice clinically. He found his calling in research and returned to Columbia later that year, eventually becoming a full professor in 1978.

Research and career

During the late 1970s, Axel, along with microbiologist Saul J. Silverstein and geneticist Michael H. Wigler, discovered a technique of cotransformation via transfection, a process which allows foreign DNA to be inserted into a host cell to produce certain proteins.
A family of patents, now colloquially referred to as the "Axel patents", covering this technique were filed for February 1980 and were issued in August 1983. As a fundamental process in recombinant DNA research as performed at pharmaceutical and biotech companies, this patent proved quite lucrative for Columbia University, earning it almost $100 million a year at one time, and a top spot on the list of top universities by licensing revenue. The Axel patents expired in August 2000.

In their landmark paper published in 1991, Buck and Axel cloned olfactory receptors, showing that they belong to the family of G protein coupled receptors. By analyzing rat DNA, they estimated that there were approximately one thousand different genes for olfactory receptors in the mammalian genome. This research opened the door to the genetic and molecular analysis of the mechanisms of olfaction. In their later work, Buck and Axel have shown that each olfactory receptor neuron remarkably only expresses one kind of olfactory receptor protein and that the input from all neurons expressing the same receptor is collected by a single dedicated glomerulus of the olfactory bulb.

Axel's primary research interest is on how the brain interprets the sense of smell, specifically mapping the parts of the brain that are sensitive to specific olfactory receptors. He holds the titles of University Professor at Columbia University, Professor of Biochemistry and Molecular Biophysics and of Pathology at Columbia University's College of Physicians and Surgeons, and Investigator of the Howard Hughes Medical Institute. In addition to contributions to neurobiology, Axel has also made seminal discoveries in immunology, and his lab was one of the first to identify the link between HIV infection and immunoreceptor CD4.

In addition to making contributions as a scientist, Axel has also mentored many leading scientists in the field of neurobiology. Seven of his trainees have become members of the National Academy of Sciences, and currently six of his trainees are affiliated with the Howard Hughes Medical Institute's investigator and early scientist award programs.

Awards and honors
In addition to the Nobel Prize, Axel has won numerous awards and honors. He was elected a Fellow of the American Academy of Arts and Sciences and a member of the National Academy of Sciences in 1983. In 2005, Axel received the Golden Plate Award of the American Academy of Achievement.

Axel was awarded the Double Helix Medal in 2007. CSHL Double Helix Medal Honoree and was elected a Foreign Member of the Royal Society (ForMemRS) in 2014. His nomination reads:

Personal life
Axel is married to fellow scientist and olfaction pioneer Cornelia Bargmann. Previously, he had been married to Ann Axel, who is a social worker at Columbia University Medical Center. Owing to his tall stature, Axel played basketball during high school.

References

External links

 - pressrelease

1946 births
Living people
Nobel laureates in Physiology or Medicine
American Nobel laureates
Richard-Lounsbery Award laureates
Members of the United States National Academy of Sciences
American neuroscientists
Jewish biologists
Jewish American scientists
Stuyvesant High School alumni
Columbia College (New York) alumni
Columbia University alumni
Johns Hopkins School of Medicine alumni
Columbia Medical School faculty
Howard Hughes Medical Investigators
Fellows of the American Academy of Arts and Sciences
Foreign Members of the Royal Society
Members of the American Philosophical Society
Scientists from New York (state)